The University Museum of Bergen is a university museum in Bergen, Norway. The museum features material related to anthropology, archaeology, botany, geology, zoology, art, and cultural history.

History
The University Museum of Bergen was founded in 1825 by Wilhelm Frimann Koren Christie, at the time president of the Storting. Founded under the name University Museum of Bergen with the intent of building large collections in the fields of culture and natural history, it became the grounds for most of the academic activity in the city, a tradition which has prevailed since the museum became part of the University of Bergen. The University Museum of Bergen is divided into two departments, the Natural History Collections and the Cultural History Collections and Public Outreach and exhibitions. It is also the caretaker of the museum garden, formerly the botanical garden, surrounding the natural history building, and the city's arboretum.

This was the first dedicated museum building in Norway. In its early years, the museum contained numerous art collections, including several works by the painter Johan Christian Dahl, cultural artefacts, and craftwork items. In 1931, the museum moved from its location in the Seminarium Fredericianum building near Bergen Cathedral School (Bergen katedralskole), to a new building southwest of Lille Lungegårdsvannet.

The current natural history building was designed by Johan Henrik Nebelong and finished in 1865. Bergen Museum moved in during 1866. The wings of the building were added in 1898 and the botanical garden was laid out between 1897 and 1899. The cultural history department got its own building in 1927. The increasing research activity at the museum from the late 19th century and onward led directly to the founding of the University of Bergen in 1946.

References

External links

 Universitetsmuseet i Bergen 
 University Museum of Bergen 
 Universitetsmuseet i Bergen blir stengt på ubestemt tid 

Museums in Bergen
Natural history museums in Norway
University museums in Norway
University of Bergen
History museums in Norway
1825 establishments in Norway
Museums established in 1825